Voronezhavia was an airline based in Voronezh, Russia. Its flight operations had been taken over by Polet Airlines, Voronezhavia itself manages Voronezh Airport.

Code data
IATA Code: ZT
ICAO Code: VRN
Callsign: Voronezhavia

Destinations

Domestic destinations
Anapa
Chelyabinsk
Yekaterinburg
Kazan
Moscow
Norilsk
Perm
Saint Petersburg
Samara
Sochi
Ufa
Voronezh

International destinations
Turkey
Adana
Azerbaijan
Baku
Moldova
Chişinău
Ukraine
Dnipro
Kyiv
Belarus
Minsk
Armenia
Yerevan

External links
Official website

Defunct airlines of Russia
Former Aeroflot divisions
Companies based in Voronezh